The Guinea-Bissau national basketball team is the national basketball team from Guinea-Bissau. It has yet to appear at the FIBA World Championship or the FIBA Africa Championship.

It is administered by the Federacao de Basquetebol da Guinée Bissau.

Competitive record

Summer Olympics
yet to qualify

World Championship
yet to qualify

FIBA Africa Championship
yet to qualify

African Games

yet to qualify

Lusophony Games

2006 : 5th
2009 : 5th
2014 : 6th
2017 : To be determined

Current roster
At the 2011 Afrobasket qualification: (last publicized squad)

|}

| valign="top" |

Head coach

Assistant coaches

Legend

Club – describes lastclub before the tournament
Age – describes ageon 10 August 2011

|}

See also
Guinea-Bissau women's national basketball team
Guinea-Bissau national under-18 basketball team
Guinea-Bissau national under-16 basketball team

References

External links
Afrobasket.com - Guinea Bissau Men National Team 
Guinea Bissau Basketball Records at FIBA Archive

1994 establishments in Guinea-Bissau
Men's national basketball teams
Basketball
Basketball in Guinea-Bissau
Basketball teams in Guinea-Bissau